Kamena Gora is a mountain on the border of Serbia and Montenegro, near the town of Prijepolje. It belongs to the Dinaric mountain range. Its highest peaks are Crni vrh on the Montenegrin side, and Ravna gora on the Serbian side, with an elevation of 1496 m each.

Tourist access and facilities are centered on village of Kamena Gora on the slopes of the mountain.

As of 2013, an area of 78.07 hectares on the mountain is proposed for status of nature park in the national register of protected resources. The famous "Holy pine", estimated to be 500 years old, is also proposed for protection as a "botanic natural monument".

References

External links
Kamena gora.com, Website of Kamena gora

See also
 List of mountains in Serbia

Mountains of Serbia
Mountains of Montenegro
Prijepolje
Montenegro–Serbia border